Halliburton Field may refer to:

 Halliburton Field (airport) in Duncan, Oklahoma; named after Earle P. Halliburton, the founder of Halliburton Corporation
 Halliburton Field (athletic facility) in Duncan, Oklahoma